Varuhuset (The Department Store) is a Swedish drama series that aired on SVT in 60 episodes between 19 March 1987 and 8 April 1989. Amongst the actors that appeared in the series were Görel Crona, Lena Endre, Sharon Dyall and Christina Schollin. The series was created by Peter Emanuel Falck.

References

External links 

1980s Swedish television series
1987 Swedish television series debuts
1989 Swedish television series endings